Aleksey Petrovich Zhigalov (25 February 1915 – 7 July 1963) was a Russian diver. He competed in the 3 m springboard at the 1952 Summer Olympics and finished in eighth place.  He won 17 national titles in the springboard (1934, 1936, 1937, 1943–1949) and platform (1934, 1936, 1937, 1946–1947, 1950, 1952). His wife, Lyubov Zhigalova, also competed in the springboard at the 1952 Olympics.

References

1915 births
1963 deaths
Olympic divers of the Soviet Union
Divers at the 1952 Summer Olympics
Soviet male divers